愛の瑄言 *精選輯 (py. Ài de Xuān Yán *Jīngxuǎn Jì) is a compilation album by Taiwanese singer/actress/model Vivian Hsu, released in March 2001 on the BMG label. It contains a selection of tracks from all five of Vivian's albums released on the BMG label: 大麻煩, 不敗の戀人, its Japanese translation Fuhai no Koibito, its Taiwanese special edition Happy Past Days, and 假扮的天使. It is also the last Vivian album produced by BMG.

The second CD also contains two video tracks.

Catalog number: 74321-855092

Track listing

CD one
"大麻煩" (py. Dà Máfán, en. Big Trouble) – 4:59
"不敗的戀人" (py. Bùbài de Liànrén, en. Undefeatable Lover) – 3:42
"假扮的天使" (py. Jiǎbàn de Tiānshǐ, en. Pretend Angel) – 3:25
"台北下了雪" (py. Táiběi Xiàle Xǔe, en. Snow in Taipei) – 5:24
"坐在月亮上" (py. Zuò Zài Yuèliàng Shàng) – 5:09
"不愛了" (py. Bùàile) – 4:17
"她他" (py. Tā Tā) – 4:34
"姐你睡了嗎" (py. Jiě Nǐ Shuìle ma, en. Sister, Have You Slept?) – 4:29
"希臘咒語" (py. Xīlà Zhòu Yǔ) – 4:30
"半調子" (py. Bàn Diàozǐ) – 5:09

CD two
 video track
 video track
 感情核心 (py. Gǎnqí Héxīn) – 3:45
 老夫婦 (py. Lǎo Fū Fù) – 5:03
 快過期的草莓 (py. Kuài Guòqī de Cǎoméi) – 4:21
 不需要理由 (py. Bùxūyào Lǐyòu) – 4:02
 我很Blue (py. Wō Hěn Blue) – 4:49
 Happy Past Days – 4:45

References

Vivian Hsu albums
2001 albums
Mandarin-language albums